Nyakahita is a sparsely populated settlement in the Western Region of Uganda.

Location
The coordinates of Nyakahita are:0°24'48.0"S 31°06'46.0"E (Latitude:-0.413333; Longitude:31.112778).

Points of interest
The Nyakahita–Kazo–Kamwenge–Fort Portal Road makes a T-junction with theMbarara-Masaka highway at Nyakahita. The town of Lyantonde, population 13,586 people in 2014, in Lyantonde District, lies to the immediate east of Nyakahita on this highway.

See also
 List of roads in Uganda
 List of cities and towns in Uganda

References

Kiruhura District
Populated places in Western Region, Uganda